The discography of Richard Thompson, an English singer/songwriter and guitarist, consists of 18 solo studio albums, three live albums and 16 singles, in addition to six studio albums and two live albums credited to  Richard and Linda Thompson and five studio albums as a member of Fairport Convention, as well as a number of fan club and boutique label releases, soundtracks and collaborations. He has also appeared as a guest musician on the albums of several other artists.

Albums

Studio albums

Live albums

Fan club and boutique label releases

Compilations

Singles

With Linda Thompson

Solo

Soundtracks
Soundtrack albums on which a Richard Thompson recording or composition are included are not shown here. Listed here are soundtracks in which Thompson was involved in the actual recording.

In 2009 "Time to Ring Some Changes" from Hard Cash was included in Topic Records' 70-year anniversary boxed set Three Score and Ten as track 13 on the sixth CD.

With Fairport Convention
Only albums recorded whilst Richard Thompson was a member of Fairport Convention are listed here. After Thompson left the group, he continued to appear sporadically as a guest musician on subsequent albums, which are listed in the session work discography. For more details of Fairport Convention's album releases see Fairport Convention discography

Studio albums

Live albums

Collaborations
Albums on which Thompson has guested or worked as a session musician are not shown here. (see next section) Listed here are albums on which Thompson played a significant creative role in the group or on the recording.

As a guest or session musician

DVDs and videos

Instructional tapes and discs

References

Discographies of British artists
Rock music discographies